Gezi Cohen is (גזי כהן; sometimes "Gazi"; born in 1938) is an Israeli former Olympic weightlifter. Cohen was born in Baghdad, Iraq.

Weightlifting career
He competed for Israel at the 1960 Summer Olympics in Rome, in Weightlifting--Men's Featherweight. Cohen came in 19th after lifting  total in his best lifts in military press, snatch, and clean & jerk.

References

External links
"Gazi Cohen", the-sports.org

1938 births
Living people
Olympic weightlifters of Israel
Iraqi emigrants to Israel
Israeli male weightlifters
Weightlifters at the 1960 Summer Olympics
Israeli people of Iraqi-Jewish descent
Sportspeople from Baghdad